Malcolm Katzenstein Brachman (December 9, 1926 – January 11, 2005) was an American bridge player who won a world championship.

Brachman was born in Fort Worth, Texas.

Brachman was married to Minda Delugach Brachman, a high-ranking player in the ACBL who won its annual mixed teams championship (Master Mixed Teams) in 1968 playing with Helen Sobel Smith, Oswald Jacoby, and Jim Jacoby. She died on March 19, 2003.

He graduated from Yale University (BA) and Harvard University (Ph.D. physics), and later instructed at the University of Chicago and Southern Methodist University.

Bridge accomplishments

Wins

 Bermuda Bowl (1) 1979
 North American Bridge Championships (7)
 Vanderbilt (1) 1978 
 Reisinger (3) 1976, 1980, 2003 
 Spingold (3) 1978, 1983, 1986

Runners-up

 North American Bridge Championships
 Grand National Teams (2) 1998, 2004 
 Vanderbilt (1) 1976 
 Mitchell Board-a-Match Teams (1) 1984 
 Reisinger (1) 1990

References

External links
 
 

1926 births
2005 deaths
American contract bridge players
Bermuda Bowl players
People from Dallas
Yale College alumni
Harvard Graduate School of Arts and Sciences alumni
University of Chicago faculty
Southern Methodist University faculty